Settimio Arturo Ferrazzetta O.F.M. (Selva di Progno, Verona, 8 December 1924- Bissau, 26 January 1999) was an Italian-born Guinea-Bissauan Roman Catholic bishop.

He was ordained a priest at the Order of Friars Minor on 1 July 1951. In 1955 he went to Portuguese Guinea as a missionary, where he dedicated himself to health and educational activities. He first started a leprosery in Cumura.

After the independence of Guinea-Bissau, he was appointed the first bishop of the new Roman Catholic Diocese of Bissau, on 21 March 1977, being ordained on 19 June 1977. He continued his missionary activity, working for the promotion at the human, social and religious levels of the Guinea-Bissauans. Ferrazzetta achieved the respect and admiration of the population in general, not only the small Roman Catholic community, but also the Muslim and animist communities.

In 1998, during the armed tension between President João Bernardo Vieira and general Ansumane Mane, he worked as the mediator. He died soon afterwards, before the end of the hostilities, on 26 January 1999, aged 74 years old. His death was mourned as a great national loss. He was buried in the Bissau Cathedral.

References

External links
Bishop Settimio Ferrazzetta Brief Biography (Italian)
Bishop Settimio Ferrazzetta at Catholic Hierarchy

1934 births
1999 deaths
Italian Roman Catholic bishops in Africa
Bissau-Guinean Roman Catholic bishops
20th-century Roman Catholic bishops in Guinea-Bissau
Roman Catholic missionaries in Guinea-Bissau
Italian Roman Catholic missionaries
Italian expatriates in Guinea-Bissau
Franciscan bishops
Franciscan missionaries
Italian Franciscans
Roman Catholic bishops of Bissau